Beach Sambo competition at the 2016 Asian Beach Games was held in Da Nang, Vietnam from 30 September to 2 October 2016 at Bien Dong Park.

Beach Sambo fights were held only in the standing position in three minutes. Victory was awarded after a throw when the opponent as a result of conducting active action falls on the sand on any part of the body other than the feet.

Medalists

Men

Women

Medal table

Results

Men

62 kg
30 September

74 kg
1 October

90 kg
30 September

+90 kg
2 October

Women

56 kg
30 September

64 kg
1 October

72 kg
1 October

+72 kg
2 October

References

External links 
Official website

2016 Asian Beach Games events
2016 in sambo (martial art)